Janki Bodiwala is an Indian actress from Ahmedabad, India who predominantly works in the Gujarati film industry. She is known for Chhello Divas (2015), Tamburo (2017), Chhutti Jashe Chhakka (2018) and Bau Na Vichar (2019).

Early life
Janki was born in Ahmedabad, Gujarat to Bharat Bodiwala and Kashmira Bodiwala. She has a brother Dhrupad Bodiwala. She has done her schooling from M K Secondary & Higher Secondary School, Ahmedabad. She did not complete her graduation in Bachelor of Dental Science (BDS) from Goenka Research Institute of Dental Science, Gandhinagar. She also participated in Miss India 2019 where she was in the top 3 finalist of Miss India Gujarat.

Career
Bodiwala made her acting debut in the Gujarati film, Chhello Divas, written and directed by Krishnadev Yagnik. The film released on 20 November 2015 in 231 screens worldwide with positive reviews from critics and commercial success.

In 2017, she acted in O! Taareee, Tamburo and Daud Pakad. She later appeared in films like Chhutti Jashe Chhakka, Tari Maate Once More (2018) and Bau Na Vichaar (2019). She appearrd in Krishnadev Yagnik's Naadi Dosh (2022) along with Yash Soni.

Media 
Bodiwala was ranked in The Times Most Desirable Women at No. 50 in 2019.

Filmography

References

External links
 
 
 

Living people
Gujarati people
Actresses in Gujarati cinema
1995 births